The United Nations Office at Geneva (UNOG) in Geneva, Switzerland, is one of the four major offices of the United Nations where numerous different UN agencies have a joint presence. The main UNOG administrative offices are located inside the Palais des Nations complex, which was originally constructed for the League of Nations between 1929 and 1938.  

Besides United Nations administration, the Palais des Nations also hosts the offices for a number of programmes and funds such as the United Nations Conference on Trade and Development (UNCTAD), the United Nations Office for the Coordination of Humanitarian Affairs (OCHA) and the United Nations Economic Commission for Europe (ECE). 

The United Nations and its specialized agencies, programmes and funds may have other offices or functions hosted outside the Palais des Nations, normally in office spaces provided by the Swiss Government.

UN specialised agencies and other UN entities with offices in Geneva hold bi-weekly briefings at the Palais des Nations, organized by the United Nations Information Service at Geneva.

UNOG produces an annual report where it lists all major events and activities that happened through a year.

Constituent agencies

Headquartered in Geneva

 Conference on Disarmament
 International Bureau of Education
 International Computing Centre
 International Labour Organization
 International Organization for Migration
 International Trade Centre
 International Telecommunication Union
 Joint Inspection Unit
 Joint United Nations Programme on HIV/AIDS
 Office of the United Nations High Commissioner for Human Rights
 United Nations Chief Executives Board for Coordination
 United Nations Compensation Commission
 United Nations Conference on Trade and Development
 United Nations Economic Commission for Europe
 United Nations High Commissioner for Refugees
 United Nations Human Rights Council (see also United Nations Commission on Human Rights)
 United Nations Institute for Disarmament Research
 United Nations Institute for Training and Research
 United Nations Non-Governmental Liaison Service
 United Nations Office for the Coordination of Humanitarian Affairs
 United Nations Office on Sport for Development and Peace
 United Nations Research Institute For Social Development
 World Health Organization
 World Intellectual Property Organization
 World Meteorological Organization
 World Trade Organization

Presence at Geneva
Food and Agriculture Organization of the United Nations - FAO (headquarters in Rome)
 International Atomic Energy Agency (headquarters are in Vienna)
 United Nations Environment Programme (headquarters are in Nairobi)
 United Nations Educational, Scientific and Cultural Organization (headquarters are in Paris)
 United Nations Industrial Development Organization (headquarters are in Vienna)
 World Food Programme (headquarters are in Rome)
United Nations World Tourism Organization (headquarters in Madrid)

Directors-general 

 Wladimir Moderow, Poland, 1946–1951
 Adriaan Pelt, Netherlands, 1952–1957
 Pier Pasquale Spinelli, Italy, 1957–1968
 Vittorio Winspeare-Guicciardi, Italy, 1968–1978
 Luigi Cottafavi, Italy, 1978–1983
 Eric Suy, Belgium, 1983–1987
 Jan Mårtenson, Sweden, 1987–1992
 Antoine Blanca, France, 1992–1993
 Vladimir Petrovsky, Russia, 1993–2002
 Sergei Ordzhonikidze, Russia, 2002–2011
 Kassym-Jomart Tokayev, Kazakhstan, 2011–2013
 Michael Møller, Denmark, 2013–2019
 Tatiana Valovaya, Russia, 2019–present

Administrative history 
 United Nations Geneva Office, from beginning, Aug 1946 – Apr 1947, (IC/Geneva/1)
 European Office of the UN, 11 Apr 1947  – 10 Aug 1948, (IC/Geneva/49)
 United Nations Office at Geneva, 10 Aug 1948  – 9 Aug 1949, (IC/Geneva/152)
 European Office of the UN, 9 Aug 1949  – 8 Dec 1957, (SGB/82/Rev.1)
 United Nations Office at Geneva, 8 December 1957 – present, (SGB/82/Rev.2)

See also
 Headquarters of the United Nations (New York City)
 United Nations Information Service at Geneva
 United Nations Office at Vienna
 United Nations Office at Nairobi
 Outline of the United Nations
 List of United Nations organizations by location
 List of international organizations based in Geneva

Notes

References

Bibliography 
 Joëlle Kuntz, Geneva and the Call of Internationalism: A History, Éditions Zoé, 2011, 96 pages.

External links

 Official website
 UN Geneva information
 United Nations organisations in Geneva
UN Geneva Annual Report

Organisations based in Geneva
Diplomatic buildings
United Nations properties